The Vaigai is a river in the Tamil Nadu state of southern India; it passes through the towns of Theni, Dindigul and Madurai. It originates in Varusanadu Hills, the Periyar Plateau of the Western Ghats range, and flows northeast through the Kambam Valley, which lies between the Palani Hills to the north and the Varushanad Hills to the south. The Vattaparai Falls are located on this river. As it rounds the eastern corner of the Varushanad Hills, the river turns southeast, running through the region of Pandya Nadu. Madurai, the largest city in the Pandya Nadu region and its ancient capital, lies on the Vaigai. The river empties into the Palk Bay near Alagankulam, close to Pamban Bridge in Ramanathapuram District.

Vaigai Mention

Sangam literature (circa 300 BCE to 300 CE) has paid many tributes to Vaigai, extolling it as 'the river that brings water when one touches it', viz the etymology Vai (Earth) + yai (sky) = Vaiyai .

The following story is told about the birth of the river Vaigai. Koodal Purana details the origin of Vaigai river flowing through Madurai . It is believed that Vishnu stood up as Trivikrama, with one of his foot rising to the skies and the foot reached Brahmaloka, the abode of Brahma . Brahma was pleased to perform ablution to the raised foot and the water is believed to have emerged as a rivulet called Krithimala. As the river came from sky and fell into Earth it is called Vai which means Vaiyam (Earth) and Yai means coming down hence, the name Vaiyai and later changed into vaigai. It is mentioned as Vaiyai in Paripatal and not Vaigai .  A large number of banana trees sprang up in the place and it came to be known as Kadhalivana, a forest of banana trees. It also is mentioned as the sanskrit name Krithamal by a Pandya king by the following story . Satyavrata, a ruler of Madurai was a staunch devotee of Vishnu. It is believed that once Vishnu came out of the river Krithimala as a  fish (Matsya avatar, one of the avatars of Vishnu) to teach Vedas to the ruler. From then on, the Pandyas started having fish as the symbol of the kingdom.

Tributaries
The main tributaries of the river Vaigai are, the river Suruliyaru, the river Mullaiyaaru, the river Varaganadi, the river Manjalaru, river kottagudi and river Kridhumaal, Upparu river. Vaigai Dam is the major dam in this river which is present in Theni district.

Vaigai gets major feed from the Periyar Dam in Kumili, Kerala. Water from the Periyar River in Kerala is diverted into the Vaigai River in Tamil Nadu via a tunnel through the Western Ghats. In summers, the Vaigai river ends up dry very often. The water never reaches Madurai, let alone flowing into places past Madurai.

Dams

The Vaigai Dam is built across the river in Periyakulam taluk, in the Theni district of Tamil Nadu. It provides water for irrigation for the Madurai district and the Dindigul district as well as drinking water to Madurai and Andipatti. Near the dam, the Government of Tamil Nadu has constructed an Agricultural Research Station for researching the growing of a variety of crops, including rice, sorghum, blackgram, cowpea and cotton.

The Periyar Dam was built in 1895 by John Pennycuick, who implemented a plan proposed over a century earlier by Pradani Muthirulappa Pillai of Ramnad. The dam was built by the British Army Engineering corps for the Travancore kingdom. The first dam was washed away by floods, and a second masonry dam was constructed in 1895.

"Greater than the mother bearing child/Greater than the child that is born/Every breath is Periyar/Every word is Periyar/In every place, in all the world/As far as Periyar water flows/Your name will stand-Pennycuick-your name/Though written on water, will always stand".

That is how Anthony Muthu Pillai (1863–1929) had paid tributes in Tamil to John Pennycuick, the engineer who had taken up the "audacious and unprecedented feat of...engineering" for transferring some water from the Periyar river in Travancore State to the Vaigai basin in Madras Presidency.

See also
Kaveri–Vaigai Link Canal

References

Rivers of Tamil Nadu
Rivers of India
Geography of Madurai